Republican Township is a township in Clay County, Kansas, USA.  As of the 2000 census, its population was 1,024.

Geography
According to the USGS, it contains one cemetery, Madura.

The streams of Cane Creek and Quimby Creek run through this township.

Transportation
Republican Township contains one airport or landing strip, Wakefield Municipal Airstrip.

References
 USGS Geographic Names Information System (GNIS)

External links
 US-Counties.com
 City-Data.com

Townships in Clay County, Kansas
Townships in Kansas